Cavalieri is an Italian surname.

 Bonaventura Cavalieri (1598–1647), Italian mathematician
 Caterina Cavalieri (1755–1801), Austrian opera soprano
 Diego Cavalieri (born 1982), Brazilian footballer; goalkeeper for Crystal Palace F.C.
 Emilio de' Cavalieri (1550–1602), Italian composer of the late Renaissance
 Grace Cavalieri (born 1932), American poet and playwright
 Joey Cavalieri, American comic book writer and editor
 Lina Cavalieri (1874–1944), Italian opera soprano
 Paola Cavalieri (born 1950), Italian philosopher
 Tommaso dei Cavalieri (c. 1508-1587), Italian friend of Michelangelo

See also 
 Cavalieri's principle
 Cavalieri's quadrature formula

Italian-language surnames